Marie-Noëlle Battistel , born  in Grenoble (Isère), is a French politician.

Political career

She was elected to the municipal council of La Salle-en-Beaumont in 1995 and became mayor three years later. She still holds this position today.

In 2007, Didier Migaud, socialist deputy of Isère's 4th constituency, asked her to be his substitute during the legislative elections.

In 2010, she was elected Regional Councillor of Rhône-Alpes on the list led by Jean-Jack Queyranne.

Following the resignation of Didier Migaud, appointed head of the Court of Auditors by Nicolas Sarkozy on 23 February 2010, she was chosen by the PS to be their candidate in the by-election for his successor.
On 6 June 2010 she was elected in the second round of the by-election with 58.38% of the votes cast.

She was re-elected on 17 June 2012.

In the 18 June 2017 elections she was re-elected and her constituency, the 4th of Isère, is the only one of this department not won by La République En Marche!

She is particularly opposed to the opening to competition of hydroelectric concessions; in 2018, Contexte indicated that "she seems to have convinced many of her novice counterparts on the subject".

References

External links
 Her page on the site of the National Assembly
 Her site

Deputies of the 13th National Assembly of the French Fifth Republic
Deputies of the 14th National Assembly of the French Fifth Republic
Deputies of the 15th National Assembly of the French Fifth Republic
1956 births
Living people
21st-century French women politicians
Deputies of the 16th National Assembly of the French Fifth Republic